James Edgar Claxton (December 14, 1892 - March 3, 1970) was a Canadian-American baseball pitcher, and the first black man to play organized white baseball in the twentieth century.

Early life and background
Jimmy Claxton was born on December 14, 1892, in Wellington, British Columbia, to American parents. Claxton's parents were 32-year-old William Edgar Claxton, a miner from Lynchburg, Virginia, and 18-year-old Emma Richards from Illinois. Claxton's mother had turned 18 just 24 days before the wedding, which was January 14, 1892. The Claxtons moved to Tacoma, Washington, when Jimmy was three months old.

The Claxton family was of a multiracial background, including people of black, Native American, French, Irish, and English ancestry. Jimmy and his siblings have been classified as white, black, and mulatto by various census-takers. Claxton's World War I draft registration card lists his race as Ethiopian. The minister officiating the marriage of Claxton's parents noted "The bridegroom is a coloured man; the bride a white woman" on the marriage record, which laid the groundwork for difficulties for Jimmy Claxton later.

Baseball career
Claxton began playing baseball at age thirteen, as a catcher for the town team of Roslyn, Washington. He later moved to pitcher. At age 18, he struck out eighteen players in a single game while pitching for a team from Chester, Washington.

By 1916, Claxton had made his way to the Oakland, California, where he played for an all-black team. In Oakland, he came the attention of the management of the Oakland Oaks of the Pacific Coast League. Claxton was introduced to the team owner by a part Native American friend as a fellow member of an Oklahoma tribe. At the time, African Americans were segregated in professional baseball, but Native Americans were allowed.

On May 28, 1916, Claxton broke the professional baseball color line when he played two games for the Oaks. Claxton pitched in two games of a doubleheader for a combined total of two and one third innings. He allowed three runs, four hits, and four walks. The Zee-Nut candy company produced a baseball card for Claxton, making him the first African American baseball player to appear on a baseball card. Within a week, a friend of Claxton revealed that he had both African American and Native American ancestors, and Claxton was promptly fired. In an interview with the Contra Costa Times in 1964, Claxton explained that no reason was given for his dismissal, but he believed it was due to his race. Oaks manager Rowdy Elliott claimed that Claxton was released because of his performance. It was nearly thirty years before another black man played organized white baseball.

After leaving the Oaks, Claxton played for Shasta Limited, an all-black semi-professional team based in northern California. While with the Shastas, he set a bush league record by striking out nineteen players in a single game. He won a state semi-professional championship while pitching with the Shastas.

Claxton played for many different teams in the negro leagues, including the Chicago Union Giants and the Cuban Stars. 

In 1932, he pitched for both Pollock's Cuban Stars and the Washington Pilots of the East–West League.

He pitched his final game at age 63, during an old-timer's game in Tacoma, Washington.

Claxton died on March 3, 1970, in Tacoma.

See also
Jackie Robinson
William Clarence Matthews

References

Sources
 Baseball by Ken Burns; New York: Alfred Knopf, 1994

Primary sources
 1891 Canadian census. 

 Marriage records. Claxton and Richards. BC Archives.

External links
  and Seamheads
 The Baseball Biography Project
 Jimmy Claxton. Mount Benson School History.

1892 births
1970 deaths
African-American baseball players
Black Canadian baseball players
Canadian expatriate baseball players in the United States
Jackie Robinson
Sportspeople from Nanaimo
Canadian people of African-American descent
Native American baseball players
History of Black people in British Columbia
Baseball people from British Columbia
Washington Pilots players
Oakland Oaks (baseball) players
Pollock's Cuban Stars players